Bushwhacked may refer to:

 Bushwhacked (film), a 1995 film starring Daniel Stern, Brad Sullivan, and Corey Carrier
 Bushwhacked!, an Australian children's adventure television series
 Bushwhacked: Life in George W. Bush's America, book by Molly Ivins and Lou Dubose
 "Bushwacked" MP3, satirical speeches created from parts of George W. Bush's orations
 "Bushwhacked" (Firefly), the third episode of science-fiction television series Firefly

See also
 Bushwhackers (disambiguation)